The Surrey Cup is an annual rugby union knock-out club competition organized by the Surrey Rugby Football Union.  The original cup competition was first played for back in 1890, the inaugural winners being Lennox, but was discontinued in 1909, having been held intermittently over 20 seasons, due to cup competitions being considerable 'undesirable'.  The cup was reintroduced around 50 years later for the 1970–71 season, with the first winners of the modern competition being Guildford & Godalming.  It is the most important rugby union cup competition in Surrey, ahead of the Surrey Trophy, Surrey Shield and Surrey Bowl.

At present the Surrey Cup is a much smaller competition than it used to be with only a few clubs based in tier 5 (National League 3 London & SE) of the English rugby union league system taking part along with 2nd teams of teams in tiers 3-4 (National League 1 and National League 2 South). The final is held at Molesey Road, Hersham (home of Esher RFC) in May - on the same date and venue as the other Surrey finals.

Surrey Cup winners

Number of wins
Sutton & Epsom (10)
Esher (8)
Richmond (6)
Streatham-Croydon (6)
Guildford (4)
London Irish (4)
Camberley (3)
Dorking (3)
Old Mid-Whitgiftians (3)
London Devonians (2)
Old Alleynians (2)
Battersea (1)
Customs Sports (1)
Effingham & Leatherhead (1)
Kingston (1)
KCS Old Boys (1)
Lennox (1)
London Irish Wild Geese (1)
Old Whitgiftian (1)
Rosslyn Park (1)
Surbiton (1)
Wimbledon II (1)
Weybridge Vandals (1)

Notes

See also
Surrey Bowl
Surrey RFU
Surrey Shield
Surrey Trophy

References

External links
Surrey RFU

Recurring sporting events established in 1890
1890 establishments in England
Rugby union cup competitions in England
Rugby union in Surrey